Marilândia is a municipality located in the Brazilian state of Espírito Santo. Its population was 12,963 (2020) and its area is 328 km².

References

Municipalities in Espírito Santo